Northern Virginia United FC is an American soccer club based in Leesburg, Virginia. They currently have teams in the fourth-tier National Premier Soccer League and fifth-tier United Premier Soccer League.

The club's primary nickname is 'NVU' and the name used across all of their social media platforms is 'NVUFC'. The club play their home matches at Cropp Metcalfe Park at Evergreen Sportsplex. All home games are broadcast live from Evergreen Sportsplex via the club's YouTube channel.

History
Northern Virginia United FC was founded in 2018 by Brian Welsh and Chris Jennings. They joined the fourth-tier National Premier Soccer League and playing out of Evergreen Sportsplex in Leesburg, Virginia. Their original crest  reflected the area's aviation history and status as an Internet hub. However, the crest eventually change to include a lion, a homage to Brian Welsh's former club in Scotland, Dundee United. They played their first match on June 1, 2018, defeating FC Frederick by a score of 2–1.

In 2019, the Northern Virginia United Youth Academy was formed. The academy joined the Super Y League in 2021.

In 2020, they added a club in the fifth-tier United Premier Soccer League, while continuing to operate their NPSL side. However, their debut in the UPSL was delayed as they were unable to compete in 2020 due to the COVID-19 pandemic.

In March 2021, NVUFC announced a partnership with Scottish Premiership club Dundee United F.C. The partnership's formation was due in part due to Brian Welsh, the owner and manager of NVUFC, being a former longtime player for Dundee United. The partnership will allow for the sharing of resources, with players and coaches being able to travel for training experiences between the two clubs. As part of the partnership, NVUFC rebranded their logo to align with the Dundee United crest, adopting the tangerine color and logo brand assets.

Current roster

.

Club management

 Front Office Coaching staff

References

External links 
 NVU FC

Association football clubs established in 2018
Soccer clubs in Virginia
2018 establishments in Virginia
Leesburg, Virginia
Dundee United F.C.
National Premier Soccer League teams
United Premier Soccer League teams